Arica is a town in the Amazonas Department, Colombia.

Populated places in the Amazonas Department